Miccosukee is a small unincorporated community in northeastern Leon County, Florida, United States. It is located at the junction of County Road 59 (Veterans Memorial Drive) and County Road 151 (Moccasin Gap Road). Miccosukee was a major center of the Miccosukee tribe, one of the tribes of the developing Seminole nation, during the 18th century.

Geography
Miccosukee, like other unincorporated areas in northern Leon County, is an area of rolling hills dotted with ponds and lakes. The large, swampy Lake Miccosukee borders the eastern edge of the community.

History

The town of Miccosukee or Mikasuki was settled by members of the Miccosukee tribe, a group of Creek origin who had settled in Florida and become part of the developing Seminole nation. The Miccosukee often fought armed battles with white settlers. It was mapped by the British in 1778 and originally called Mikasuki with 60 homes, 28 families, and a town square. Some 70 gunmen protected the town. It was the capital of the short-lived State of Muskogee.

At the time he visited on his voyage of destruction in 1818 (First Seminole War), "Andrew Jackson and his men were stunned by the sheer size of the Miccosukee town. Having been occupied since before the American Revolution, it was a town of long-standing permanence." Jackson burned over 300 homes before departing on April 5, 1818. Whites estimated there were up to 500 warriors, and "the town was the largest in Florida at the time".

In 1831, a U.S. Post Office was built along with schools, churches, and stores. Eventually the area became a center of cotton plantations, as was most of Leon County. Prior to the Civil War Miccosukee had three cotton plantations nearby, Miccosukee Plantation, Ingleside Plantation and Blakely Plantation.

After the Civil War, the area reverted to farms and by 1887, the Florida Central Railroad served Miccosukee. During the 1890s, wealthy industrialists bought large tracts of land for quail hunting plantations or estates removing thousands of acres of land from agricultural production. Miccosukee thrived until the boll weevil infestation of 1918. The Great Depression (1929-1935) destroyed Leon County's agriculture and the railroad pulled out in the mid-1940s.

Demographics

2020 census

As of the 2020 United States census, there were 383 people, 120 households, and 70 families residing in the CDP.

Historical places
Concord School (Miccosukee) was built in 1894 in the town of Miccosukee for grades 1-6. It was closed in 1985. The building is still used for Miccosukee's Head Start program.
Van Brunt-Morris House just north of the junction of State Road 59 and Moccasin Gap Road. 
Averitt-Winchester House
Miccosukee Methodist Church
Strickland-Herold House, located northwest of the junction of State Road 59 and Moccasin Gap Road.

Civil War history
During the Civil War, soldiers from Miccosukee enlisted in Company K, 5th Florida Infantry and Company B, 1st Florida Cavalry. The following soldiers are interred at Runners Cemetery and other locations. 
Pvt. Walter H. Averitt - Born December 24, 1841 in North Carolina. More details
3rd Lieutenant Walter Richard Blake, Jr. - Born January 13, 1836 in Leon County. More details
2nd Corporal C. Washington Branch - Born 1838 in Leon County More details.
Captain Isham Miles Blake - Born May 3, 1837 in Leon County. More details
Pvt. Leonidas Byrd -  Birth date unknown. More details
Pvt. John Alexander Cromartie - Born August 14, 1834 in North Carolina More details. 
4th Sergeant Jesse Sinclair Montford - Born June 13, 1829 in Leon County. More details

Political

Community facilities
Concord School - Served as a Leon County elementary school until it closed in 1985.  The school yard now serves as a county park.
The Miccosukee Community Center is administered by the Tallahassee-Leon County Parks and Recreation Department.  The center is used for a variety of activities including monthly "Senior Outreach" days.
Reeves Landing is a public boat launching facility on Lake Miccosukee just east of the village.

Groups and organizations
The Miccosukee Volunteer Fire-Rescue has a fire station in the village, on Cromartie Road.
Miccosukee Youth Education Foundation

See also
 Miccosukee Land Co-op
 History of Leon County, Florida
 Plantations of Leon County

References

Paisley, Clifton; From Cotton To Quail, University of Florida Press, c1968.

External links
1940 map of Miccosukee
Miccosukee Land Co-op
Miccosukee Youth Education Foundation
Photo of Reeves Fish Camp, Reeves Landing, Lake Miccosukee.

Unincorporated communities in Leon County, Florida
Tallahassee metropolitan area
Capitals of former nations
History of Leon County, Florida
Unincorporated communities in Florida
Former populated places in Leon County, Florida